Yevgeni Aleksandrovich Butakov (born 24 July 1998) is a Russian professional football player. He plays for Murom.

Club career
He made his professional debut for FC Baltika Kaliningrad on 2 November 2014 in a Russian Football National League match against FC Sibir Novosibirsk.

On 26 September 2020, he joined FC Belshina Bobruisk on loan. On 6 April 2021, he re-joined Belshina on a new loan until the end of 2021.

References

External links
 Profile by the FNL
 
 

1998 births
Living people
People from Usolye-Sibirskoye
Sportspeople from Irkutsk Oblast
Russian footballers
Association football midfielders
FC Baltika Kaliningrad players
FC Sokol Saratov players
FC Saturn Ramenskoye players
FC Belshina Bobruisk players
Russian First League players
Russian Second League players
Belarusian Premier League players
Belarusian First League players
Russian expatriate footballers
Expatriate footballers in Belarus